The Terminal Railroad Association of St. Louis  is a Class III switching and terminal railroad that handles traffic in the St. Louis, Missouri, metropolitan area. It is co-owned by five of the six Class I railroads that reach the city.

Present operation
The Terminal Railroad Association is owned by BNSF Railway, Canadian National Railway (Illinois Central Railroad until 1999), CSX Transportation, Norfolk Southern Railway, and Union Pacific Railroad. All own one-seventh of the railroad except UP, which owns three-sevenths. 

The Terminal Railroad also connects with the Kansas City Southern Railway. The Canadian Pacific Railway is the only Class I railroad that does not reach the St. Louis area.

The TRRA owns and operates the MacArthur and Merchants bridges, the two Mississippi River railroad crossings in the St. Louis metropolitan area. In 2022, the TRRA completed a $222 million rebuild of the 1889 Merchants Bridge. In the same year, the TRRA began a $57.3 million renovation of the MacArthur Bridge that includes replacing the 1912 main span girders and rebuilding the Broadway truss in downtown St. Louis.

The Association also owns and operates Madison Yard, the largest classification yard in the St. Louis region. The switching yard consists of 80 inbound, outbound, and holding tracks with a capacity of 2,200 cars. The company is planning to expand Madison Yard to hold another 1,500 railcars, for a yard total of 4,000.

The railroad operates 30 locomotives to move cars around the yard, deliver cars to local industries, and ready trains for departure.

History

Wiggins Ferry Company 

The railroad's predecessor companies in St. Louis date to 1797, when the town was still part of Spanish Upper Louisiana. James Piggott was granted a license to operate a ferry between St. Louis and Illinoistown (now East St. Louis, Illinois). In 1819, Piggott's heirs sold the ferry to Samuel Wiggins, who operated the service with eight horses until a steam-powered ferry took over in 1828.

In 1870, the ferry began porting rail cars across the river one car at a time until the 1874 completion of the Eads Bridge.

When the Terminal Railroad was incorporated in 1889, railroads owned most of the Wiggins Ferry property. In 1902 when the Rock Island Line joined the Terminal Railroad, the ownership of the Wiggins Illinois property was complete.

Terminal Railroad Association 
The formation of the Terminal Railroad Association of St. Louis grew out of an agreement orchestrated by Jay Gould in 1889 between predecessor entities of the Terminal Railroad Association of St. Louis and six proprietary railroads. Those original railroads were:

 Missouri Pacific Railroad
 St. Louis, Iron Mountain and Southern Railway, later part of the Missouri Pacific
 Wabash Railroad, later part of the Norfolk and Western Railway
 Ohio and Mississippi Railroad, later part of the Baltimore and Ohio Railroad
 Louisville and Nashville Railroad
 Cleveland, Cincinnati, Chicago and St. Louis Railway, later part of the New York Central Railroad

The Association built Union Station, opening it in 1894. The station would close in 1978 when Amtrak moved to a temporary facility several hundred yards to the east. 

In its early years, the Association was at odds with the St. Louis Merchants Exchange. The Exchange built the Eads Bridge but lost control to the Terminal Railroad. The Exchange then built the Merchants Bridge to keep the Terminal Railroad from having a monopoly. The Exchange then lost control of that bridge also to the Terminal Railroad.

The railroad's practice of charging a tariff to coal trains crossing the Mississippi River persuaded several industries to set up shop in Illinois rather than Missouri. The steelmaking town of Granite City, Illinois, was founded in 1896 to avoid the tariffs.

In 1989, the TRRA traded the Eads Bridge to the City of St. Louis in exchange for the MacArthur Bridge.

Lines

The TRRA operates the following lines:
Merchants Subdivision: Grand Avenue (BNSF/UP) via Union Station, Gratiot Street (UP), Poplar Street (UP), North Market Street (BNSF/NS), West Approach, Merchants Bridge, and "SH" to "WR" (KCS/NS/UP/Port Harbor Railroad)
Illinois Transfer Subdivision: "SH" via "CP" (NS), Willows (CSX/KCS), and Southern (NS) to Valley Junction (KCS/UP)
MacArthur Bridge Subdivision: Gratiot Street (UP) via South Approach Junction (UP), MacArthur Bridge, North Approach Junction, and East Approach (Alton and Southern Railway) to Valley Junction (KCS/UP)
North Belt Subdivision: West Approach via May Street (NS) and Carrie Avenue to Baden Yard (BNSF)
West Belt Subdivision (Operation currently leased to West Belt Railway): Carrie Avenue to Rock Island Junction (Central Midland Railway)
Eads Subdivision: North Approach Junction via "Q" (CSX/KCS/UP) to "CP"

Awards and recognition 
For four years beginning in 2001, TRRA received the Gold E. H. Harriman Award for safety in the Switching and Terminal railroad class. In 2015, 2017, and 2021 the TRRA was awarded American Short Line and Regional Railroad Association's Presidential Award for safety (most man hours of injury free operation). In 2020 the TRRA received the American Short Line and Regional Railroad Association's Veteran Engagement Award.

Short Line Railroad of the Year

References

External links 

Terminal Railroad Association of St. Louis
TRRA Trackage Map (PDF)
Trainweb profile

Illinois railroads
Missouri railroads
Economy of St. Louis
Rail in St. Louis
Organizations based in Missouri
Switching and terminal railroads
Railway companies established in 1889
1889 establishments in Missouri